The women's 3 metre springboard, also reported as springboard diving, was one of four diving events on the Diving at the 1988 Summer Olympics programme.

The competition was split into two phases:

Preliminary round (24 September)
Divers performed ten dives. The twelve divers with the highest scores advanced to the final.
Final (25 September)
Divers performed another set of ten dives and the score here obtained determined the final ranking.

Results

References

Sources
 

Women
1988
1988 in women's diving
Div